My Little Flufties is a 3D life simulator similar to Tamagotchi published on Nintendo DS and Windows by Lexicon Entertainment. The game is distributed by JoWood Productions in Europe and Dreamcatcher in North America. The game title is AniMates in North America.

Gameplay
Aimed at children aged 5–9, gamers can choose between 5 imaginary creatures. You must nourish, wash, educate and amuse the creatures to keep the game going.

The fairy-like 3D world contains several attractions like swings and slides. Next to that, there are also 5 mini-games available in the game:
 Mole-o-matic: jump on the head of the moles to stun them. 
 Shoot the balloons: shoot with a peashooter to pop coloured balloons. 
 Fish-o-matic: catch fish with a fishing net. 
 Hopscotch: jump on the good squares to advance. 
 Find the Tweet-Tweet: find 4 birds hidden in the game's world.

The game uses a full 3D engine but with a traditional drawing style.

My little Flufties was also distributed by Oberon Media on download online store.

References

External links
 

2006 video games
Nintendo DS games
Video games developed in France
Video games scored by Olivier Deriviere
Virtual pet video games
Windows games
JoWooD Entertainment games
Single-player video games